Baltimore Township is a township in Henry County, Iowa, USA.

References

Henry County, Iowa
Townships in Iowa